Innocent is a given name and a surname. Notable people with the name include:

Given name
 Pope Innocent (disambiguation)
 Saint Innocent (disambiguation)
 Innocent (actor) (born 1948), Indian actor and producer
 Innocent (Giesel) (c. 1600–1683), Prussian-born historian, writer, and political and ecclesiastic figure
 Innocent, Bishop of Syrmia (fl. 13th century)
 Innocent Anyanwu (born 1982), Dutch professional boxer
 Innocent Asonze (born 1972), Nigerian sprinter
 Innocent Awoa (born 1988), Cameroonian footballer
 Innocent Barikor (fl. 21st century), Nigerian academic and politician
 Innocent Bashungwa (born 1979), Tanzanian politician
 Innocent Bologo (born 1989), Burkinabé sprinter
 Innocent Boutry (fl. 17th century), French Kapellmeister
 Innocent Chikunya (born 1985), Zimbabwean cricketer
 Innocent Chinyoka (born 1982), Zimbabwean cricketer
 Innocent Chukwuma (born 1961), Nigerian business magnate and investor
 Innocent Egbunike (born 1961), Nigerian sprinter
 Innocent Emeghara (born 1989), Swiss footballer
 Innocent Gentillet (1535–1588), French lawyer and politician
 Innocent Guz (1890–1940), born Joseph Adalbert Guz, Polish conventual Franciscan priest martyred by the Nazis
 Innocent Hamga (born 1981), Cameroonian footballer
 Innocent Idibia (born 1975), stage name 2Baba, Nigerian singer, songwriter, and producer
 Innocent Kaia (born 1992), Zimbabwean cricketer
 Innocent Kalogeris (born 1959), Tanzanian politician
 Innocent Lotocky (1915–2013), American Bishop of the Ukrainian Catholic Church
 Innocent Maela (born 1992), South African soccer player
 Innocent Mdledle (born 1985), South African footballer
 Innocent Melkam (1981), Nigerian footballer
 Innocent Muchaneka (born 1991), Zimbabwean footballer
 Innocent Masina Nkhonyo (born 1987), Malawian Chichewa-language writer and poet
 Innocent Nshuti (born 1998), Rwandan footballer
 Innocent Ntsume (born 1980), South African footballer
 Innocent Obiri (fl. 21st century), Kenyan politician
 Innocent Ordu (born 1961), Nigerian Anglican bishop
 Innocent Oula (born 1961), Ugandan army officer and politician
 Innocent Pikirayi (born 1963), Zimbabwean archaeologist
 Innocent Ranku (fl. 20th/21st centuries), Botswanan footballer
 Innocent Sagahutu (born 1962), Rwandan soldier who participated in the 1994 Rwandan genocide
 Innocent Simiyu (born 1983), Kenyan rugby union footballer
 Innocent Sousa (1879-1962), Indian English-language poet and writer
 Innocent Umezulike (1953–2018), Nigerian jurist
 Innocent Mahamadu Yahaya (1954–2000), Ghanaian politician

Also
 Audu Innocent Ogbeh (born 1947), Nigerian politician

Surname
 Bonke Innocent (born 1996), Nigerian footballer
 Garissone Innocent (born 2000), French footballer
 George Innocent (1885–1957), British swimmer
 Harold Innocent (1933–1993), English actor
 Nnamdi Innocent (born 1980), Nigerian Paralympic powerlifter

See also
 Innocenti (surname)
 Inocencio (surname)
 Innocencio